Douglas A. Hancey, Jr. (born in Logan, Utah) is a Republican Idaho State Representative since 2012 representing District 34 in the A seat.

Education
Hancey earned his BS in accounting from Brigham Young University.

Elections
2012 When Republican Representative Mack G. Shirley retired and left the District 34 A seat open, Hancey won the three-way May 15, 2012 Republican Primary with 1,997 votes (46.2%), and won the November 6, 2012 General election with 13,424 votes (79.7%) against Democratic nominee Lary Larson.

References

External links
Douglas A. Hancey at the Idaho Legislature
 

Year of birth missing (living people)
Living people
Brigham Young University alumni
Republican Party members of the Idaho House of Representatives
Politicians from Logan, Utah